Federal Rideau is a bulk carrier owned an operated by Fednav. She, and her sister ship, were built in Ōshima, Japan in 2000. The vessel entered service the same year. The vessel has had two incidents in her career, both in 2014.

Description
The vessel has a gross tonnage (GT) of 20,659 tons and a deadweight tonnage (DWT) of 36,563 tons.

Service history
The ship was constructed by Oshima Shipbuilding at their shipyard at Ōshima, Japan. The vessel's keel was laid down on 14 September 1999 and the bulk carrier was given the yard number 10261. Built the same year as her sister ship , Federal Rideau was launched on 27 November 1999 and completed 31 January 2000. The ship is registered in the Marshall Islands and is owned and operated by Fednav.

In July 2014 she ran aground in Lake St. Clair, near Peche Island, and required five tugboats to get free. She was carrying 20,000 tons of wheat from Thunder Bay to Montreal. In December 2014 a failure of the Martin Luther King Bridge over the Maumee River blocked her progress in Toledo, Ohio.

References 

Bulk carriers
1999 ships
Ships built by Oshima Shipbuilding